The 1984 World Junior Figure Skating Championships were held on December 5–11, 1983 in Sapporo, Japan. Commonly called "World Juniors" and "Junior Worlds", the event determined the World Junior champions in the disciplines of men's singles, ladies' singles, pair skating, and ice dancing. The regular senior-level NHK Trophy competition was not held that year, the World Junior Championships being held in its stead.

Results

Men

Ladies

Pairs

Ice dancing

References

World Junior Figure Skating Championships, 1984
1983 in figure skating
World Junior Figure Skating Championships
International figure skating competitions hosted by Japan